Alexei Nikolaevich Severtsov (11 September 1866 – 16 December 1936) was a Russian and Soviet evolutionary zoologist who worked on comparative anatomy and morphology. He was the son of the zoologist Nikolai Severtzov. He studied the evolution of vertebrates and established an institute for evolutionary morphology which is now named after him as the AN Severtsov Institute of Ecology and Evolution. He introduced various concepts of phyloembryology and evolutionary physiology. 

Severtsov was born in Moscow where his father was the zoologist, Nikolai Severtzov. After private schooling in Petrov, Bobrovsky Uyezd in the Voronezh Governorate, he went to the Lomonosov University in 1885 and graduated in 1895. Influential teachers included P.P. Sushkin, M. A. Menzbir, I. M. Sechenov, K. A. Timiryazev, and V. V. Markovnikov. 

He then worked at marine biology laboratories in Villefranche-sur-Mer, Naples, and Germany. He received a doctorate in 1898 for research on the metameres of the head of the torpedo ray and went to teach zoology from at the University of Dorpat (Tartu) and from 1902 at Kiev and then from 1911 at Moscow. For his work on the evolution of the lower vertebrates he received the Karl Baer Prize of 1919. He studied the origin of the maxillary apparatus and the breathing organs of fish. In 1930 he established a laboratory for evolutionary anatomy and morphology. Severtsov followed on the theme of organ function change begun by St. George Mivart and Anton Dohrn. 

One of his students was Ivan Schmalhausen. Severtsov developed the biogenetic law or recapitulation theory of Ernst Haeckel under the term that he coined, phyloembryologenesis, and attempted to explain evolution through morphological and developmental changes. He explained this in a book in German Morphologische Gesetzmäßigkeiten der Evolution published in 1931.

References 

1886 births
1936 deaths
Russian anatomists
Russian zoologists
Moscow State University alumni
Scientists from Moscow
Anatomists from the Soviet Union
Soviet zoologists